Sphenomorphus nigrolabris  is a species of skink found in Indonesia.

References

nigrolabris
Reptiles described in 1873
Taxa named by Albert Günther
Reptiles of Sulawesi